The Chama Cha Mapinduzi (CCM;  in English) is the dominant ruling party in Tanzania and the second longest-ruling party in Africa, only after the True Whig Party of Liberia. It was formed in 1977, following the merger of the Tanganyika African National Union (TANU) and the Afro-Shirazi Party (ASP), which were the sole operating parties in mainland Tanzania and the semi-autonomous islands of Zanzibar respectively.

TANU and its successor CCM have ruled Tanzania uninterruptedly since independence. The party has been described as authoritarian. Since the creation of a multi-party system, CCM has won the past six general elections in 1995, 2000, 2005, 2010, 2015 and 2020. Jakaya Kikwete, its presidential candidate in 2005, won by a landslide, receiving more than 80% of the popular vote and John Magufuli as a candidate in 2020 exceeded to 84% campaign. In the 2010 election, it won 186 of the 239 constituencies, continuing to hold an outright majority in the National Assembly.

History
The party was created on February 5, 1977, under the leadership of Julius Nyerere, through the merger of the Tanganyika African National Union (TANU), the ruling party in Tanganyika, and the Afro-Shirazi Party (ASP), the ruling party in Zanzibar.

TANU/CCM has dominated the politics of Tanzania since the independence of Tanganyika in 1961. Due to the merger with the ASP, from 1977 it has also been the ruling party in Zanzibar, though there its grip on power has been more contested by the Chama cha Demokrasia na Maendeleo (CHADEMA).

From its formation until 1992, it was the only legally permitted party in the country. Every five years, its national chairman was automatically elected to a five-year term as president; he was confirmed in office via a referendum. At the same time, voters were presented with two CCM candidates for the National Assembly or Bunge. This changed on July 1, 1992, when amendments to the Constitution and a number of laws permitting and regulating the formation and operations of more than one political party were enacted by the National Assembly.

Ideology
Originally a champion of African socialism, upholder of the system of collectivized agriculture known as Ujamaa and firmly oriented to the left, today the CCM espouses a more mixed economic approach. CCM hopes to continue to modernize in order to ensure:
Increased productivity which would boost the country's revenue
Increased employment and improved management
Acquisition of new and modern technology
Increased and expanded local and international markets for our products, and;
Improved and strengthened private sector serving as the engine of the national economy while the government sharpens its focus on provision of social services, infrastructure, security and governance of the state.

Similarly, the CCM's major foreign policy focus is economic diplomacy within the international system, and peaceful coexistence with neighbors.

Electoral performance and support base
The CCM has a leading role in society, despite having multiparty democracy in Tanzania since 1995, the CCM has kept to power ever since. Empirical analysis has shown that a sense of nostalgia for a party which brought independence, and which has maintained relative peace is a major cause of the CCM's support base; age had no significant determinant on loyalty to the CCM. The party has strong support from subsistence farmers.

The party has won all presidential elections at both the national level and in Zanzibar at the autonomous level under the multi-party system: 1995, 2000, 2005, 2010 and 2015. It also dominates the legislature.

In the elections for Zanzibar's presidency and House of Representatives, held on 30 October 2005, incumbent president and CCM candidate Amani Abeid Karume won with 53% of the vote, while the party won 30 seats out of 50.

In the national elections for Tanzania's presidency and National Assembly, held on 14 December 2005, Foreign Minister and CCM candidate Jakaya Kikwete won with 80.28% of the vote. Out of the 232 seats filled through direct election, the CCM won 206.

On 31 October 2010, Jakaya Kikwete was reelected president with 61% of the vote, while CCM obtained 186 out of the 239 directly elected seats.

On 30 October 2015 John Magufuli of CCM won the election with 58% of the vote. Next elections on 30 October 2020 he was reelected president with 84% of the vote.

CCM was admitted into the Socialist International as a full member at the SI's spring congress on 4–5 February 2013.

Leadership

Current leaders
Samia Suluhu Hassan is the current Chairperson of the Chama Cha Mapinduzi following the death of John Pombe Magufuli, the former Chairman and President of United Republic of Tanzania.

National leaders
 Chairwoman: Samia Suluhu Hassan 
 Vice Chairman Zanzibar: Ali Mohamed Shein
 Vice Chairman Mainland: Abdulrahman Omar Kinana
 Secretary General: Daniel Godfrey Chongolo
 Deputy Secretary General Zanzibar: Dr Abdalla Juma
 Deputy Secretary General Mainland: Catherine Mndeme
 Secretary for Organisation: Perreira Ame Silima
 Secretary for Party Ideology and Publicity: Shaka Hamdu Shaka
 Secretary for Party Affairs and International Relations: Rtd. Colonel Ngemela Lubinga
 Secretary for Economic Affairs and Finance: Dr Frank George Haule Hawassi

National Chairman

National Vice Chairman (Mainland)

National Vice Chairman (Zanzibar)

Secretaries General

Electoral history

Presidential elections

Bunge elections

References

External links
 Official blog
 Ally Sykes

 
Tanzanian MPs 2015–2020
Political parties in Tanzania
Political parties established in 1977
1977 establishments in Tanzania
Former member parties of the Socialist International
Progressive Alliance
Parties of one-party systems
Julius Nyerere